Beijing–Binhai intercity railway (abbreviated as Jingbin intercity railway), formerly known as the Second Beijing–Tianjin intercity railway, is a high-speed railway connecting the municipalities of Beijing and Tianjin. The western section of the railway is built as part of the Beijing–Tangshan intercity railway. From Baodi railway station onwards, the railway will branch south along new trackage to Binhai West railway station in Binhai New Area of Tianjin.

Together with the Beijing–Tangshan intercity railway, this railway forms part of a proposed regional 4 North-South lines, 4 East-West lines that together form a network for fast commuter services across the densely populated Beijing, Tianjin and Hebei area.

History

Baodi to Beichen section
Advanced engineering commenced onsite at 29 December 2015. The section opened on 30 December 2022.

Beichen to Binhai West section 

Route
It starts at Beijing railway station, which is located in Dongcheng District. And then it goes into Xianghe County, Hebei, and Baodi District, Tianjin. This project then deviates from the Beijing-Tangshan ICR alignment to travel south through eastern Wuqing District, Ninghe District, Beichen District, Dongli District serving a station at Tianjin Binhai International Airport then terminating in Tianjin's Binhai New Area.

Stations
The section from Baodi to  opened on 30 December 2022. The remaining section is also under construction.

References

High-speed railway lines in China
Rail transport in Beijing
Rail transport in Hebei
Rail transport in Tianjin
Standard gauge railways in China
Airport rail links in China